Eddy Rinke-Leitans (born 26 July 1991) is a German-Latvian professional ice hockey player. He currently plays for ERC Ingolstadt in the Deutsche Eishockey Liga

External links
 

1991 births
Living people
ERC Ingolstadt players
German ice hockey right wingers
People from Ebersberg (district)
Sportspeople from Upper Bavaria